Pitstop  may refer to:

 Pit stop, in motor racing, when the car stops in the pits for fuel and other consumables to be renewed or replenished
 Pit Stop (1969 film), a movie directed by Jack Hill
 Pit Stop (2013 film), a movie directed by Yen Tan
 Pitstop (video game), a 1983 computer game by Epyx
 Penelope Pitstop, a cartoon character
 Pit Stop, an album by The Ziggens